The Polytechnic University of the Philippines, Lopez Branch also known as PUP-LQ (Filipino: Politeknikong Unibersidad ng Pilipinas, Sangay sa Lopez) is one of the four (4) satellite campuses of the Polytechnic University of the Philippines in Quezon province.

Undergraduate programs
College of Accountancy (COA)
 Bachelor of Science in Accountancy (BSA)

College of Business (CB)
 Bachelor of Science in Agri-business Management (BS ABM)
 Bachelor of Science in Business Administration Major in Marketing Management (BSBA-MM)
 Bachelor of Science in Office Administration Major in Corporate Transcription (BSOA-CT)

College of Education (COED)
 Bachelor in Secondary Education Major in Mathematics (BSED-MT)

College of Engineering (CE)
 Bachelor of Science in Civil Engineering (BSCE)
 Bachelor of Science in Electrical Engineering (BSEE)

College of Tourism and Hotel and Restaurant Management (CTHRM)
 Bachelor of Science in Hospitality Management (BSHM)

College of Public Administration (COPA)
 Bachelor in Public AdministrationCollege of Technology (CT) Diploma in Accounting Management Technology (DAMT) 
 Diploma in Engineering Management Technology (DEET)
 Diploma in Office Management and Technology (DOMT)
Major in Legal Office Management
Major in Medical Office Management
 Diploma in Information and Communication Technology (DICT)College of Nursing (CN)'''
Bachelor of Science in Nursing (SOON)

References

External links 
 Polytechnic University of the Philippines – Official website

Polytechnic University of the Philippines
Universities and colleges in Quezon